Dryden is a lunar impact crater that is located on the southern hemisphere on the far side of the Moon. It lies within the huge walled plain called Apollo, and is one of several features within that basin named after people associated with the Apollo program. Apollo itself has an inner ring, and Dryden is attached to the west-northwest part of that circular mountain formation. To the south of Dryden along the same range is the crater Chaffee.

The perimeter of Dryden forms a crude circle with an irregular shape due to several small outward bulges. The most notable of these is along the eastern side where the rim has slumped inwards. The rim is not significantly worn, and displays a sharp edge. Attached to the southeastern exterior is the ridge forming part of the inner ring of Apollo. The northeastward extension of this ring is less well defined, but appears to begin at the eastern rim.

Much of the inner wall of the crater consists of a gently sloping inner surface with a pile of debris along the bottom, forming a ring around the interior floor. Offset slightly northeast of the midpoint is a central peak formation. The remainder of the interior is marked only by a few tiny craterlets.

Satellite craters
By convention these features are identified on Lunar maps by placing the letter on the side of the crater midpoint that is closest to Dryden.

References

 
 
 
 
 
 
 
 
 
 
 
 

Impact craters on the Moon